Since 1886, those who have made significant achievements, heads of state, returning veterans and sport champions from the New York area or national teams have been honored with ticker-tape parades.  Parades are traditionally held along a section of Broadway, known as the "Canyon of Heroes", from the Battery to City Hall.  Each of these 206 parades has been commemorated by the Alliance for Downtown New York City with a granite strip, installed in 2004.

1880s
 1886
 October 28 – Statue of Liberty dedication (impromptu).
 1889
April 29 –  Centennial of George Washington's inauguration as first president of the United States

1890s
 1899
 September 30 – Admiral George Dewey, following return from Manila.

1910s

 1910
 June 18 – Theodore Roosevelt, following return from his African expedition.
 1912
 August – U.S. Olympic Games athletes (Stockholm, Sweden).
 1919
 September 8 – General John J. Pershing, commander of American Expeditionary Force
 October 3 – King Albert and Queen Elisabeth of Belgium
 November 18 – Edward Albert, Prince of Wales.

1920s
 1921
 October 19 – General Armando Diaz, Italian commander.
 October 28 – Ferdinand Foch, Marshal of France.
 1922
 April 24 – Joseph Joffre, Marshal of France.
 November 18 – Georges Clemenceau, former premier of France.
 1923
 October 5 – David Lloyd George, former prime minister of the United Kingdom.
 1924
 August 6 – U.S. Olympic athletes (Paris, Chamonix)
 1925
 October 21 – Captain Paul C. Grening and the crew of the SS President Harding for heroic sea rescue.
 1926
 February 16 – Captain George Fried and the crew of the SS President Roosevelt for heroic sea rescue.
 May 27 – Crown Prince Gustaf Adolf and Crown Princess Louise of Sweden
 June 23 – Commander Richard Byrd and Floyd Bennett, flight over the North Pole
 July 2 – Bobby Jones, winner of the British Open golf tournament
 August 27 – Gertrude Ederle, first woman to swim the English Channel
 September 10 – Amelia Gade Corson, first mother and second woman to swim the English Channel
 October 18 – Queen Marie of Romania.
 1927
 June 13 – Charles Lindbergh, following solo transatlantic flight.
 July 18 – "Double" parade for Commander Richard Byrd and the crew of the America; and for Clarence Chamberlin and Charles A. Levine following separate transatlantic flights.
 November 11 – Ruth Elder and George W. Haldeman following flight from New York City to the Azores.
 1928
 January 20 – W. T. Cosgrave, President of the Executive Council of the Irish Free State.
 April 25 – Hermann Köhl, Major James Fitzmaurice, and Baron von Hünefeld following first westward transatlantic flight
 August 22 – U.S. Olympic athletes.
 May 4 – Prince Ludovico Spada Potenziani, governor of Rome
 July 6 – Amelia Earhart, Wilmer Stultz, and Louis E. Gordon, following their transatlantic flight
 September 20 – Aimé Tschiffely, Swiss-Argentine horse rider from Buenos Aires to New York
 October 16 – Hugo Eckener and the crew of the Graf Zeppelin
 1929
 January 28 – Captain George Fried and the crew of the America for rescue of the Italian freighter Florida
 August 30 – Hugo Eckener and the crew of the Graf Zeppelin after round the world trip
 October 4 – James Ramsay MacDonald, prime minister of the United Kingdom

1930s
 1930
 May 26 – Marquis Jacques de Dampierre, passenger aboard the Lafayette
 June 11 – Júlio Prestes, president-elect of Brazil.
 June 18 – Rear Admiral Richard Byrd following expedition to Antarctica.
 July 2 – Bobby Jones, winner of the British Amateur and British Open golf tournaments.
 September 4 – Captain Dieudonne Coste and Maurice Bellonte following flight from Paris to New York City.
 1931
 July 2 – Wiley Post and Harold Gatty following round-the-world flight.
 September 2 - Olin Stephens Jr. and the crew of Dorade, winners of a transatlantic yacht race from Newport, R.I., to Plymouth, England
 October 22 – Pierre Laval, Prime Minister of France.
 October 26 – Philippe Pétain, Marshal of France.
 1932
 June 20 – Amelia Earhart following transatlantic flight.
 1933
 July 21 – Air Marshal Italo Balbo and crew for flight from Rome to Chicago in 25 Italian seaplanes.
 July 26 – Wiley Post following eight-day round-the-world flight.
 August 1 – Amy Johnson and her husband Jim Mollison following westward transatlantic flight, from Wales to Connecticut.
 1936 
 September 3 – Jesse Owens following winning four gold medals in the 1936 Summer Olympics.
 1938
 July 15 – Howard Hughes, following three-day flight around the world.
 August 5 – Douglas "Wrong Way" Corrigan following flight from New York City to Ireland (he was scheduled to fly to California).
 1939
 April 27 – Crown Prince Olav and Crown Princess Märtha of Norway.
 May 1 – Rear Admiral Alfred W. Johnson, commander of the Atlantic Squadron.

1940s

 1945
 June 10 – General Dwight Eisenhower, commander of the Allied Expeditionary Forces.
 August 27 – General Charles de Gaulle, interim president of France.
 September 14 – General Jonathan Wainwright, hero of Corregidor.
 October 9 – Fleet Admiral Chester Nimitz.
 October 27 – President Harry S. Truman.
 December 14 – Fleet Admiral William F. Halsey.
 1946
  January 12 – New York City Victory Parade of 1946: 82nd Airborne Division (United States) James M. Gavin New York native. Chosen as the All American Division to represent the Army and the end of WWII.
 March 14 – Winston Churchill, former prime minister of the United Kingdom
October 23 - Delegates to the first plenary session of the general assembly of the United Nations.
 1947
 January 13 – Alcide De Gasperi, premier of Italy.
 February 7 – Viscount Harold Alexander of Tunis, governor general of Canada
 May 2 – Miguel Alemán Valdés, president of Mexico
 November 18 – U.S.-to-Europe "Friendship Train" bearing gifts and supplies. 
 1948
 March 9 – Éamon de Valera, former Taoiseach of the Republic of Ireland.
 July 7 – Rómulo Gallegos, president of Venezuela
 1949
 February 3 – France-to-U.S. Merci Train bearing gifts in appreciation of the "Friendship Train"
 May 19 – General Lucius D. Clay, military governor of Germany.
 May 23 – Eurico Gaspar Dutra, president of Brazil.
 August 11 – Elpidio Quirino, president of the Philippines 
 August 19 – Connie Mack, on his fiftieth anniversary as manager of the Philadelphia Athletics.
 September 17 – Forty-eight European journalists on "American discovery" flight around United States.
 October 4 – American Legion Drum and Bugle Corps national championship.
 October 17 – Jawaharlal Nehru, prime minister of India.

1950s
 1950
 April 17 – Gabriel González Videla, president of Chile.
 April 28 – Admiral Thomas C. Kinkaid.
 May 8 – Liaquat Ali Khan, Prime Minister of Pakistan.
 August 4 – Robert Gordon Menzies, prime minister of Australia.
 August 22 – Lt. General Clarence R. Huebner
 August 31 - William O'Dwyer, recently resigned New York City mayor
 December – Ralph Bunche, United Nations mediator 
 1951
 April 3 – Vincent Auriol, president of France
 April 20 – General of the Army Douglas MacArthur
 May 9 – David Ben-Gurion, prime minister of Israel
 May 24 – U.S. 4th Infantry Division 8th Regimental Combat Team, first troops sent overseas in support of the North Atlantic Treaty Organization
 June 25 – Galo Plaza Lasso, president of Ecuador
 September 17 – Sir Denys Lowson, Lord Mayor of the City of London.
 September 28 – Alcide De Gasperi, prime minister of Italy.
 October 29 – United Nations servicemen wounded in Korea.
 November 13 – Women of the armed forces
 1952
 January 17 – Captain Henrik Kurt Carlsen, following rescue of the crew of the Flying Enterprise
 April 7 – Queen Juliana and Prince Bernhard of the Netherlands.
 July 7 – U.S. Olympic team.
 July 18 – Commodore Harry Manning and the crew of the United States following new speed record crossing the Atlantic.
 December 18 – Lt. General Willis D. Crittenberger. World War II combat commander in Italy and retiring commander of US First Army headquartered at Fort Jay, Governors Island, New York.
 1953
 January 30 – Vice Admiral Walter S. DeLany, Commander of the Navy's Eastern Sea Frontier and the Atlantic Reserve Fleet
 April 3 – Metropolitan New York Combat Contingent, first troop transport to return from Korea.
 April 24 – Lt. General James A. Van Fleet.
 July 21 – Ben Hogan, winner of the Triple Crown of Golf.
 October 1 – José Antonio Remón Cantera, president of Panama
 October 20 – General Mark W. Clark
 October 26 – Major General William F. Dean
 November 2 – King Paul and Queen Friederike of Greece.
 1954
 February 1 – Celal Bayar, president of Turkey.
 April 22 – U.S. 4th Infantry Division, following return from Korea
 June 1 – Haile Selassie, emperor of Ethiopia.
 July 26 – Lieutenant Geneviève de Galard-Terraube, the "Angel of Dien Bien Phu".
 August 2 – Syngman Rhee, president of South Korea.
 September 27 – New York Giants, winners of the National League pennant. 
 October 28 – William V.S. Tubman, president of Liberia.
 November 19 – Lt. Gen. Withers A. Burress, retiring Commander of the First Army
 1955
 January 31 – Paul Eugène Magloire, president of Haiti.
 August 11 – Order of the Knights of Pythias.
 November 4 – Carlos Castillo Armas, president of Guatemala.
 December 9 – Luis Batlle Berres, president of Uruguay.
 1956
 March 12 – Giovanni Gronchi, president of Italy.
 May 15 – Armed Forces Day.
 May 23 – Sukarno, president of Indonesia.
 1957
 May 2 – Navy League tribute for 60 commanders of the Navy and Marines during World War II.
 May 13 – Ngo Dinh Diem, president of South Vietnam.
 July 2 – Captain Alan J. Villiers and the crew of the Mayflower II.
 July 11 – Althea Gibson, winner of the Wimbledon women's singles championship.
 October 21 – Queen Elizabeth II of the United Kingdom.
 December 9 – King Mohammed V of Morocco.
 1958
 May 20 – Van Cliburn, winner of the Moscow International Tchaikovsky Competition. The only musician to ever receive a ticker tape parade tribute.
 June 20 – Theodor Heuss, president of West Germany.
 June 23 – Carlos P. Garcia, president of the Philippines.
 August 27 – Rear Admiral Hyman G. Rickover, Commander William Anderson, and the crew of the USS Nautilus.
 1959
 January 29 – Arturo Frondizi, president of Argentina.
 February 10 – Willy Brandt, mayor of West Berlin.
 March 13 – José María Lemus, president of El Salvador.
 March 20 – Seán T. O'Kelly, President of Ireland.
 May 29 – King Baudouin of Belgium.
 September 11 – Princess Beatrix of the Netherlands.
 October 14 – Adolfo López Mateos, president of Mexico.
 November 4 – Ahmed Sékou Touré, president of Guinea.

1960s
 1960
 March 9 – Carol Heiss, Olympic figure skating gold medalist.
 April 11 – Alberto Lleras Camargo, president of Colombia.
 April 26 – Charles de Gaulle, president of France.
 July 5 – King Bhumibol Adulyadej and Queen Sirikit Kitiyakara of Thailand.
 October 14 – King Frederick IX and Queen Ingrid of Denmark
 October 19 – John F. Kennedy, Democratic presidential nominee.
 November 2 – President Dwight Eisenhower and Vice President Richard Nixon, Republican presidential nominee.
 1961
 April 10 – New York Yankees, winners of the American League pennant.
 May 11 – Habib Bourguiba, president of Tunisia.
 October 13 – Ibrahim Abboud, president of Sudan.
 October 27 – builders and crew of the USS Constellation
 1962
 March 1 – John Glenn, following the Mercury-Atlas 6 mission.
 
 April 5 – João Goulart, president of Brazil.
 April 9 – New York Yankees, winners of the World Series.
 April 12 – New York Mets, upon entering the National League.
 April 16 – Shah Mohammad Reza Pahlavi and Empress Farah of Iran.
 May 25 – Félix Houphouët-Boigny, president of Ivory Coast.
 June 5 – Scott Carpenter, following the Mercury 7 mission.
 June 8 – Archbishop Makarios, head of the Cypriot Orthodox Church and president of Cyprus.
 June 14 – Roberto F. Chiari, president of Panama.
 1963
 January 17 – Antonio Segni, president of Italy.
 April 1 – King Hassan II of Morocco.
 May 22 – Gordon Cooper, following the Mercury 9 mission.
 June 10 – Sarvepalli Radhakrishnan, president of India.
 September 10 – King Mohammed Zahir Shah and Queen Humaira of Afghanistan.
 October 4 – Haile Selassie, emperor of Ethiopia.

 1964
 July 16 – Operation Sail vessel crews.
 October 8 – Diosdado Macapagal, president of the Philippines.
 1965
 March 29 – Virgil "Gus" Grissom and John Young, following the Gemini 3 mission.
 May 19 – Chung Hee Park, president of South Korea.
 1969
 January 10 – Frank Borman, James A. Lovell, and William A. Anders, following the Apollo 8 mission to the Moon.
 August 13 – Neil Armstrong, Buzz Aldrin, and Michael Collins, following Apollo 11 mission to the Moon.
 October 20 – New York Mets championship in the World Series.

1970s
1971
 March 8 - Alan Shepard, Edgar Mitchell, and Stuart Roosa, following Apollo 14 mission to the Moon.
 August 24 - David Scott, James Irwin, and Alfred Worden, following Apollo 15 mission to the Moon.
1976
 July 6 - Sailors from around the world participating in Bicentennial Operation Sail.
1977
 October 19 – New York Yankees championship in the World Series.
 1978
 October 19 – New York Yankees championship in the World Series.
 1979
 October 3 – Pope John Paul II.

1980s
 1981
 January 30 – American hostages released from Iran.
 1984
 August 15 – U.S. Summer Olympics medalists.
 1985
 May 7 – Vietnam War veterans.
 1986
 October 28 – New York Mets championship in the World Series.

1990s

 1990
 June 20 – Nelson Mandela of South Africa.
 1991
 June 10 – Gulf War veterans.
 June 25 – Korean War veterans.
 1994
 June 17 – New York Rangers, winners of the Stanley Cup championship. 
 1996
 October 29 – New York Yankees championship in the World Series.
 1998
 October 17 – Sammy Sosa, Chicago Cubs right fielder, who hit 66 home runs that season, and for helping with hurricane relief efforts in the Dominican Republic.
 October 23 – New York Yankees championship in the World Series.
 November 16 – John Glenn and astronauts of Space Shuttle Discovery mission STS-95.
 1999
 October 29 – New York Yankees championship in the World Series.

2000s

 2000
 October 30 – New York Yankees championship in the World Series.
 2008
 February 5 – New York Giants championship in Super Bowl XLII.
 2009
 November 6 – New York Yankees championship in the World Series.

2010s

 2012
 February 7 – New York Giants championship in Super Bowl XLVI.
 2015
 July 10 – United States women's national soccer team championship in the 2015 FIFA Women's World Cup.
 2019
 July 10 - United States women's national soccer team championship in the 2019 FIFA Women's World Cup.

2020s
2021
July 7 - Healthcare professionals and essential workers for their labor during the COVID-19 pandemic.

Individuals honored with multiple parades
Richard E. Byrd (3), George Fried (2), Bobby Jones (2), Amelia Earhart (2), Wiley Post (2), Dwight D. Eisenhower (2), Hugo Eckener (2), Charles de Gaulle (2), Haile Selassie (2), John Glenn (2), Alcide De Gasperi (2).

Sports teams honored
New York Yankees (9), United States Olympics team (5, plus 2 individual parades for Jesse Owens and Carol Heiss), New York Mets (3), New York Giants (football) (2), United States women's national soccer team (2), New York Giants (baseball) (1), New York Rangers (1).

Potential revisions
In 2017, New York Mayor Bill de Blasio announced on Twitter that he intends to have Marshall Pétain's plaque removed from the Canyon of Heroes.  This happened after a national debate over the propriety of Confederate monuments spilled over into a reassessment of monuments in general.  Pétain was honored in 1931 for his service in World War I.  After France's defeat by Germany, he advocated surrender rather than resistance; Pétain headed the Nazi collaborationist government of Vichy France from 1940–1944.  France itself has largely removed all commemoration for Pétain; the last street named after him was renamed in 2010.

References

Kenneth T. Jackson, ed. The Encyclopedia of New York City; Yale University Press (1995), 2nd edition (2010).
Felix Riesenberg, Yankee Skippers to the Rescue; Ayer Publishing (1969), pg.66; 

History of New York City

New York City ticker-tape parades
Ticker-tape parades